Double "A" was the second album by UK band The Movies, released in 1977. The album was produced by Ray Singer, with additional production by James Guthrie at Utopia Studios, Primrose Hill.

Track listing
All tracks composed by Jon Cole; except where indicated
Side 1
"Heaven on the Street"
"Yo Yo"
"True Love Trouble" (Julian Diggle)
"Rumour"
"Playground Hero"
Side 2
"Big Boys band"
"Boogaloo"
"She's a Be-bopper"
"Living the Life"
"Chasing Angels"

Personnel
The Band
Jon Cole - lead vocals, guitar
Julian Diggle - percussion, harmonica, lead vocals on "True Love Trouble"
Greg Knowles - lead guitar, backing vocals
Jamie Lane - drums, percussion, backing vocals
Dave Quinn - bass 
Mick Parker - keyboards, clarinet, backing vocals

Additional musicians
Stan Sulzmann - soprano saxophone on "True Love Trouble"
Ray Warleigh - alto saxophone on "She's a Be-Bopper"
Richard Niles - brass arrangements

Production
Produced by Ray Singer
Engineers: Paul Hardiman, James Guthrie
 Producer/Engineer for additional overdubs & mix: James Guthrie

References 

 Sleeve notes: Double "A", 1977, GTO (GTLP 026)

External links 
[ The Movies entry at All Media Guide]

1977 albums
GTO Records albums
Albums produced by James Guthrie (record producer)